Purificacion Valera Quisumbing (c. 1934 – December 1, 2011) was a Filipino human rights activist who served as the Chairperson of Commission on Human Rights from 2002 to 2008. She was a graduate  of the University of Philippines.

In March 2011, the United Nations Human Rights Council re-elected Quisumbing to a second, three-year term on the council's advisory committee.

Quisumbing died on December 1, 2011, at the age of 77. She was survived by her husband, Leonardo Quisumbing, a retired Associate Justice of the Supreme Court of the Philippines, and their 2 daughters.

References

External links
CV at OHCHR website

2011 deaths
Filipino human rights activists
University of the Philippines alumni
Year of birth uncertain
Human Rights Council Advisory Committee experts
Chairpersons of the Commission on Human Rights of the Philippines
Arroyo administration personnel
1930s births